Woronora was an electoral district for the Legislative Assembly in the Australian state of New South Wales, named after the Woronora River or the suburb of Woronora. It was created in 1894 and abolished in 1904. It was recreated in 1973 and abolished in 1988  when it was renamed Sutherland.

Members for Woronora

Election results

Notes

References

Former electoral districts of New South Wales
Constituencies established in 1894
1894 establishments in Australia
Constituencies disestablished in 1904
1904 disestablishments in Australia
Constituencies established in 1973
1973 establishments in Australia
Constituencies disestablished in 1988
1988 disestablishments in Australia